Nakshatra is the term for lunar mansion in Hindu astrology and Indian Astronomy. A nakshatra is one of 27 (sometimes also 28) sectors along the ecliptic. Their names are related to a prominent star or asterisms in or near the respective sectors. In essence (in Western astronomical terms), a nakshatra simply is a constellation.

The starting point for the nakshatras according to Vedas is "Krittika" (it has been argued because the Pleiades may have started the year at the time the Vedas were compiled, presumably at the vernal equinox), but, in more recent compilations, the start of the nakshatras list is the point on the ecliptic directly opposite to the star Spica called Chitrā in Sanskrit, which would be Ashwinī, a part of the modern constellation Aries, and these compilations therefore may have been compiled during the centuries when the sun was passing through the area of the constellation Aries at the time of the vernal equinox. This version may have been called Meshādi or the "start of Aries".

The first astronomical text that lists them is the Vedanga Jyotisha.

In classical Hindu scriptures (Mahabharata, Harivamsa), the creation of the nakshatras is attributed to Daksha. They are personified as daughters of Daksha and as wives of Chandra, known as the Moon God (who reluctantly married the 26 other nakshatras on Daksha's request even though he was only interested to marry Rohini), or alternatively the daughters of Kashyapa.

In the Atharvaveda
In the Atharvaveda (Shaunakiya recension, hymn 19.7) a list of 27 stars or asterisms is given, many of them corresponding to the later nakshatras:

This 27 day time cycle has been taken to mean a particular group of stars. The relationship to the stars really has to do with the periodicity with which the Moon travels over time and through space past the field of the specific stars called nakshatras. Hence, the stars are more like numbers on a clock through which the hands of time pass (the moon). This concept is described by J. Mercay (2012) in connection with Surya Siddhanta.

List of Nakshatras

In Hindu astronomy, there was an older tradition of 28 Nakshatras which were used as celestial markers in the heavens. When these were mapped into equal divisions of the ecliptic, a division of 27 portions was adopted since that resulted in a clearer definition of each portion (i.e. segment) subtending 13° 20′ (as opposed to 12° ′ in the case of 28 segments). In the process, the Nakshatra Abhijit was left out without a portion. However, the Abhijit nakshatra becomes important while deciding on the timing of an auspicious event. The Surya Siddhantha concisely specifies the coordinates of the twenty-seven Nakshatras.

It is noted above that with the older tradition of 28 Nakshatras each equal segment would subtend 12.85 degrees or 12° 51′. But the 28 Nakshatra were chosen at a time when the Vedic month was recognised as having exactly 30 days. In India and China the original 28 lunar mansions were not equal. Weixing Nui provides a list of the extent of the original 28 Nakshatras expressed in Muhurtas (with one Muhurta = 48 minutes of arc). Hindu texts note there were 16 Nakshatras of 30 Muhurtas, 6 of 45 Muhurtas, 5 of 15 Muhurtas and one of 6 Muhurtas.

The 28 mansions of the 360° lunar zodiac total 831 Muhurtas or 27.7 days. This is sometimes described as an inaccurate estimate of our modern sidereal period of 27.3 days, but using the ancient Indian calendar with Vedic months of 30 days and a daily movement of the Moon of 13 degrees, this early designation of a sidereal month of 831 Muhurtas or 27.7 days is very precise.
Later some Indian savants dropped the Nakshatra named Abhijit to reduce the number of divisions to 27, but the Chinese retained all of their original 28 lunar mansions. These were grouped into four equal quarters which would have been fundamentally disrupted if it had been decided to reduce the number of divisions to 27.

Irrespective of the reason why ancient early Indian astronomers followed a Vedic calendar of exactly 12 months of 30 days it was this calendar and not a modern calendar of 365 days that they used for the astronomical calculations for the number of days taken for the Moon to complete one sidereal cycle of 360°. This is why initially they named 28 Nakshatras on their lunar zodiac.

The following list of nakshatras gives the corresponding regions of sky, per Basham (1954).

Padas (quarters)

Each of the 27 Nakshatras cover 13° 20’ of the ecliptic each. Each Nakshatra is also divided into quarters or padas of 3° 20’, and the below table lists the appropriate starting sound to name the child. The 27 nakshatras, each with 4 padas, give 108, which is the number of beads in a japa mala, representing all the elements (ansh) of Vishnu:

See also
 Astronomical basis of the Hindu calendar  
 List of Natchathara temples
 Navagraha
 Panchangam

Notes

References

External links 
 Ahargana - The Astronomy of the Hindu Calendar: Nakshatra Explains Nakshatras by means of astronomical simulations created using Stellarium.

 
+